University Heights Historic District may refer to:
 University Heights Historic District (Darby, Montana), a National Register of Historic Places listing in Ravalli County, Montana
 University Heights Historic District (Madison, Wisconsin)